is a Japanese video game publisher, with office located in Setagaya, Tokyo, Japan. The game division of Toshiba-EMI Limited spun off Hamster Corporation in November 1999.

On the Japanese PlayStation Store, more than 245 titles are distributed under the Arcade Archives brand, and 108 under the ACA Neo Geo brand. Hamster acquired the rights to Nihon Bussan's video games in March 2014, UPL's in May 2016, NMK's in June 2017, Video System's in March 2018, and Allumer's in February 2023.

Published games

Nintendo 3DS
 Akari by Nikoli
 Azito 3D
 Azito 3D: Kyoto
 Azito 3D: Osaka
 Azito 3D: Tokyo
 Bases Loaded
 City Connection
 Field Combat
 Fortified Zone
 Hashi o Kakero by Nikoli
 Heavy Fire: The Chosen Few 3D
 Heyawake by Nikoli
 Hitori ni Shitekure by Nikoli
 Kakuro by Nikoli
 Maru's Mission
 Masyu by Nikoli
 Ninja JaJaMaru-kun
 Ninja JaJaMaru-kun: Sakura-hime to Karyu no Himitsu
 Number Link by Nikoli
 Nurikabe by Nikoli
 Shikaku ni Kire by Nikoli
 Slitherlink by Nikoli
 Sudoku by Nikoli
 Yajilin by Nikoli

Nintendo Switch
 ACA Neo Geo
 Arcade Archives

PlayStation
 Cotton
 Crazy Climber
 Moon Cresta
 Frisky Tom
 Raiden
 Raiden DX
 Rapid Angel
 Sonic Wings Special
 Shienryu
 SuperLite 1500 Series
 Tall Unlimited
 The Conveni
 The Conveni 2
 Vanguard Bandits

PlayStation 2
 Akai Ito
 Hello Kitty: Roller Rescue
 Oretachi Gēsen Zoku
 Psyvariar -Complete Edition-
 Quiz & Variety SukuSuku Inufuku 2: Motto SukuSuku
 Shepherd's Crossing
 Sukusuku Inufuku
 The Conveni 3
 The Conveni 4

PlayStation 3
 BandFuse: Rock Legends
 Heavy Fire: Afghanistan
 Heavy Fire: Shattered Spear

PlayStation 4
 ACA Neo Geo
 Arcade Archives
 Sudoku by Nikoli

PlayStation Mobile
 Magic Arrows
 Appli Archives

PlayStation Portable
 Arms' Heart
 Sudoku by Nikoli
 The Conveni Portable

PlayStation Vita
 Akari by Nikoli V
 Hashi o Kakero by Nikoli V
 Heyawake by Nikoli V
 Hitori ni Shitekure by Nikoli V
 Kakuro by Nikoli V
 Masyu by Nikoli V
 Number Link by Nikoli V
 Nurikabe by Nikoli V
 Shikaku ni Kire by Nikoli V
 Slitherlink by Nikoli V
 Sudoku by Nikoli V
 Yajilin by Nikoli V

Wii
 Bases Loaded
 Brawl Brothers
 City Connection
 Crazy Climber
 Earth Defense Force
 Exerion
 Field Combat
 Formation Z
 Idol Janshi Suchie-Pai
 Karate Champ
 Moon Cresta
 Mr. Do!
 Ninja-Kid
 Ninja JaJaMaru-kun
 Rival Turf!
 Seicross
 The Ignition Factor

Wii U
 Bases Loaded
 Brawl Brothers
 Earth Defense Force
 Exerion
 Field Combat
 MagMax
 Ninja JaJaMaru-kun
 Rival Turf!
 Seicross
 Zumba Fitness: World Party

Windows 10
 ACA Neo Geo

Xbox 360
 BandFuse: Rock Legends
 Heavy Fire: Shattered Spear
 The Conveni 200X

Xbox One
 ACA Neo Geo
 Azito x Tatsunoko Legends
 Zumba Fitness: World Party

References

External links
 

 
Software companies based in Tokyo
Video game companies of Japan
Video game publishers
Video game companies established in 1999
Japanese companies established in 1999